Dan Delaunay (born 8 April 1995) is a French professional footballer who plays as a goalkeeper for  club Versailles.

Club career
Delaunay is a youth product of Le Havre, and helped Quevilly-Rouen into the Ligue 2 after consecutive promotions. Delaunay made his professional debut for Quevilly in a 1–0 Coupe de la Ligue loss to Orléans on 8 August 2017. He made his Ligue 2 debut in a 4–1 loss to Nîmes on 3 November 2017.

International career
Delaunay is a one-time youth international for France, helping the France national under-16 football team win a 2–0 friendly against the Belgium U16s on 23 September 2010.

Honours 
Versailles

 Championnat National 2: 2021–22

Notes

References

External links
 
 
 
 
 
 HAC Foot Profile

1995 births
Living people
Footballers from Le Havre
Association football goalkeepers
French footballers
France youth international footballers
US Quevilly-Rouen Métropole players
Les Herbiers VF players
GFA Rumilly-Vallières players
FC Versailles 78 players
Ligue 2 players
Championnat National players
Championnat National 2 players